Peter Lancaster  (born 14 November 1929) is a British-Canadian mathematician. He is professor emeritus at the University of Calgary, where he has worked since 1962. His research focuses on matrix analysis and related fields, motivated by problems from vibration theory, numerical analysis, systems theory, and signal processing.

Biography
Lancaster was born in Appleby, England, and attended Sir John Deane's Grammar School and the Liverpool Collegiate School. After an unsuccessful year in the University of Liverpool School of Architecture, he joined the mathematics program in the same university, graduating with an honours degree in 1952. Lancaster thereupon worked as an aerodynamicist with the English Electric Company until 1957, completing a Master's degree at the same time under the supervision of Louis Rosenhead.

He took a teaching post at the University of Malaya, from which he was granted a PhD in 1964, and moved to Canada in November 1962 to work at the University of Calgary. Lancaster held visiting positions at the California Institute of Technology (1965–66), the University of Basel (1968–69), and the University of Dundee (1975–76) as well as shorter stays at the Universities of Münster, Tel Aviv, Konstanz, and Ben-Gurion.

Lancaster served as Department Chairman from 1973 to 1977, and President of the Canadian Mathematical Society from 1979 to 1981. He was elected a Fellow of the Royal Society of Canada in 1984, and received a Humboldt Research Award in 2000.
In 2018 the Canadian Mathematical Society listed him in their inaugural class of fellows.

See also

References

1929 births
20th-century Canadian mathematicians
20th-century English mathematicians
21st-century Canadian mathematicians
English emigrants to Canada
Living people
Academic staff of the University of Calgary
Alumni of the University of Liverpool
University of Singapore alumni
Fellows of the Canadian Mathematical Society
Presidents of the Canadian Mathematical Society